Abrothallus etayoi is a species of lichenicolous fungus in the family Abrothallaceae. Found in Mexico, it was formally described as a new species in 2015 by Ave Suija and Sergio Pérez-Ortega. The species epithet honours Spanish lichenologist Javier Etayo, "a keen collector of lichenicolous fungi and lichens".

Abrothallus etayoi differs from other Abrothallus fungi by the shape of its  (barrel-shaped to somewhat spherical), and by its single-celled conidia that measure 11–17.5 by 7–11 μm. Although known only from the type locality, the authors suggest that the fungus may have a wider distribution in Mexico due to the prevalence of the ecosystem from which it was collected.

References

etayoi
Lichenicolous fungi
Fungi described in 2015
Fungi of Mexico
Taxa named by Ave Suija